The Peter White Public Library is a public library and community center in the City of Marquette, Michigan. The library building has stood at 217 North Front Street since 1904. An extensive renovation and addition was completed in 2000. The building also houses the Marquette Arts and Culture Center. The library is named after Peter White, a local businessman, postmaster, real estate developer, Michigan state legislator, and philanthropist who lived from 1830 until 1908.

During Fiscal Year 2018-19 the library contained approximately 184,000 items—including books, magazines, DVDs, CDs, art prints, E-books, and other formats. During that same year, the library welcomed an average of 639 visitors per day and circulated a total of 237,606 items. The library is owned by the citizens of the City of Marquette. Nine townships in Marquette County also contract service with the library, bringing the total population served to over 37,000. The library serves persons who live or own property in the following communities: City of Marquette, Chocolay Township, Ewing Township, Marquette Township, Sands Township, Skandia Township, Turin Township, Wells Township, and West Branch Township. The library maintains remote book drops for the return of materials at the township halls in Chocolay, Sands, and Skandia Townships. An additional drop in Marquette Township is located at the Westwood Mall, just outside the southwest corner of the building.

Other services

 United States Passport Agency
 Meeting rooms for public use
 Faxing
 Document scanning
 Printing / copying
 Extensive genealogy and local history collections
 Exam proctoring
 Programs and exhibits
 Digital audiobooks and E-books
 Digital magazines

Library board

The library has two library boards, a controlling board and an advisory board. The controlling board is the Peter White Public Library Board of Trustees. Board members are appointed by the Marquette City Commission. The Township Advisory Council is composed of members appointed by the townships contracting services with the library. Each township has two members.

History

Public library service in Marquette, Michigan, began in 1871 when the library was located in City Hall. The Peter White Public Library was formally founded by Local Act 254 of 1891 by the Michigan Legislature.

The historic building at the corner of Front and Ridge Streets was completed in 1904. The building was designed by Patton and Miller Architects of Chicago, Illinois. A renovation and expansion project designed by Frye Gillan Molinaro Architects, also of Chicago, was completed in October 2000. Gundlach Champion was the contractor. This $9.0 million project was funded by a $4.5 million city bond issue and $4.5 million capital campaign. The original building and subsequent renovations have been made possible not only through the generosity of the library namesake, but many other benefactors, and the taxpayers who support the Library.

In 2007 the library received a Library of Michigan Foundation Citation of Excellence from State Librarian Nancy Robertson. The award recognized the library for providing excellent service and meeting the needs of the community in a friendly, cost-effective, and innovative way.

In December 2010 the library received a National Medal from the Institute of Museum and Library Services (IMLS). The Medal is awarded to ten libraries or museums in the United States each year.

During 2018-2019 the library carried out a $4.2 million renovation project, funded by a bond approved by the citizens of the City of Marquette in August 2017. The project architects and engineers were Integrated Designs of Marquette, Michigan, and the general contractor was Closner Construction of Marquette, Michigan. Work included historical preservation of the original facade and stonework, reworking of the children's room, extensive HVAC modification and retrofitting, lighting improvements, carpeting, additional study rooms, added technology, and a number of other repairs and improvements.

Affiliations and memberships
 Michigan Library Association
 Midwest Collaborative for Library Services
 Superiorland Library Cooperative
 Upper Peninsula Region of Cooperation
 Great Lakes Digital Libraries
 Michigan Center for the Book
 MelCat statewide borrowing program
 Downtown Marquette Association
 Lake Superior Community Partnership

Notes

External links
 Official website

Library buildings completed in 1904
Public libraries in Michigan
Education in Marquette County, Michigan
Buildings and structures in Marquette County, Michigan